Álvaro Pino Couñago (born 17 August 1956) is a former professional road racing cyclist from Galicia who raced between 1981 through 1991 and is most famous for winning the overall title at the 1986 Vuelta a España over favorites Robert Millar from Great Britain, Laurent Fignon from France and Sean Kelly from Ireland. The following year, Pino captured the 1987 Volta a Catalunya and at the 1988 Vuelta, Pino won two stages and the King of the Mountains jersey. In all, he won five stages over his career at the Vuelta a España.

From 2007 through 2010, Pino worked as a directeur sportif for Spanish professional continental team Xacobeo–Galicia.

Major results

1981 
 1st Stage 19 Vuelta a España
1982 
 1st Subida al Naranco
 1st Stage 2b (ITT) Setmana Catalana de Ciclisme
 3rd Overall Vuelta Asturias
 5th Overall Tour of the Basque Country
 10th Overall Vuelta a España
1983
 1st Stage 3 Vuelta a Burgos
 2nd Overall Vuelta Asturias
 4th Overall Vuelta a España
Held  after stages 14 & 15a
 9th Tre Valli Varesine
1985
 3rd GP Navarra
 5th Overall Setmana Catalana de Ciclisme
 7th Overall Volta a Catalunya
 8th Overall Vuelta a España
 9th Clásica de San Sebastián
1986 
 1st  Overall Vuelta a España
1st Stage 21 (ITT)
 2nd Overall Volta a Catalunya
 8th Overall Tour de France
1987
 1st  Overall Volta a Catalunya
1st Stages 5 & 8a 
 1st  Overall Escalada a Montjuïc
1st Stage 1a & 1b (ITT)
 3rd Subida al Naranco
1988 
 2nd Overall Tour of Galicia
1st Stage 4 
 2nd Overall Escalada a Montjuïc
 4th Overall Volta a Catalunya
 5th Overall Tour of the Basque Country
 5th Overall Critérium International
 8th Overall Tour de France
 8th Overall Vuelta a España
1st  Mountains classification
1st Stages 8 & 9 (ITT)
 8th Overall Paris–Nice
 10th Road race, National Road Championships
1989 
 1st Clásica de Sabiñánigo
 2nd Klasika Primavera
 3rd Overall Volta a Catalunya
 3rd Overall Vuelta Asturias
 3rd Subida al Naranco
 5th Overall Vuelta a España
1st Stage 17
 5th Overall Tour of the Basque Country

Grand Tour general classification results timeline

External links

1956 births
Living people
People from Ponteareas
Sportspeople from the Province of Pontevedra
Cyclists from Galicia (Spain)
Spanish male cyclists